Arushki (also Romanized as Arūshkī; also known as Arashkī, Arshaki, Arūshkī-ye Pā’īn, and Redashkī) is a village in Deylaman Rural District, Deylaman District, Siahkal County, Gilan Province, Iran. At the 2006 census, its population was 233, in 73 families.

References 

Populated places in Siahkal County